Bozer is a Turkish surname. Notable people with the surname include:

 Ahmet Bozer (born 1960), Turkish business executive
 Ali Bozer (1925–2020), Turkish academic and politician
 Hasan Bozer (born 1944), Turkish politician

See also
 Bomer

Turkish-language surnames